Joseph Leon Mathieu Perez (born c.1896) was a judge from Trinidad and Tobago who was appointed by Elizabeth II as the Chief Justice of Trinidad and Tobago from 1952 to 1958. He also served as Assistant Law Officer.

Honour 
He was knighted on 15 July 1955. He was knighted by Elizabeth II as Knight Bachelor.

References 

Chief justices of Trinidad and Tobago
Knights Bachelor
Year of birth uncertain
Year of death missing